Bushy Mountain, a mountain of the Nandewar Range, a spur of the Great Dividing Range, is located in the North West Slopes region of New South Wales, Australia. Busy Mountain is situated east of Narrabri within the Mount Kaputar National Park.

See also 

 List of mountains in New South Wales

References

Volcanoes of New South Wales
Mountains of New South Wales
Extinct volcanoes
North West Slopes
Tamworth Regional Council